Dindoshi is a location in the suburb of Malad (E), in Mumbai, India.

Dindoshi houses the largest IT Park in Mumbai (Infinity IT Park), a 10-story tower block. There is a bus depot and a school, Yashodham High School, a nearby mall, Oberoi Mall and a popular temple in Gokuldham, which is a very popular. Dindoshi also houses one of the biggest Bus Depots of B.E.S.T at Mumbai, which is popularly known as Dindoshi Bus Depot. Besides the depot, there is a Dindoshi Bus Station from where there are many B.E.S.T buses available from Dindoshi to various other locations in Mumbai and vice versa like Bandra, Kurla, Malad etc. Nagri Niwara Parishad (NNP) lies to the North of Dindoshi. Dindoshi Police Station patrols the area.SHIVAM 

Neighbourhoods in Mumbai